Andrew Stuart Whittaker (born February 14, 1956) is an American structural engineer who is currently a SUNY Distinguished Professor in the Department of Civil, Structural and Environmental Engineering at the University at Buffalo, State University of New York.

Education 
Whittaker earned a bachelor's of science in civil engineering from the University of Melbourne, Australia in 1977. He received an M.S. in civil engineering in 1985, and his Ph.D in civil engineering in 1988, both from the University of California, Berkeley.

Professional career 
Whittaker is a licensed civil (C45013) and structural (S3618) engineer in California. He worked for the international consultancy Aurecon (formerly John  Connell and Associates) from 1978 to 1984 in Australia and Singapore, and for Forell/Elsesser Engineers in San Francisco, California from 1989 to 1992. He has consulted in the fields of earthquake and blast engineering since 1992.

Professional service 
Whittaker has been engaged in the development of codes, standards and guidelines in the United States since the late 1980s, including the National Earthquake Hazards Reduction Program Recommended Provisions, the American Society of Civil Engineers/Structural Engineering Institute (ASCE/SEI) Standards 4, 7, 41, 43 and 59, and American Concrete Institute (ACI) Code 349. He is a member of the ASCE Blue Ribbon Panel for the update of the ASCE Manual of Practice for Structural Design for Physical Security. He chairs the ASCE Nuclear Standards Committee, which oversees the development of ASCE/SEI Standards 1, 4 and 43.

Whittaker has served on the  Board of Directors for the Structural Engineers Association of Northern California (SEAONC) from 1996 to 1998, for the Earthquake Engineering Research Institute (EERI) from 2008 to 2010, and for the Word Seismic Safety Initiative (WSSI) from 2008 to 2010. He served on the External Advisory Board for the Southern California Earthquake Center from 2010 to 2017. Whittaker was Vice President (2003 to 2004) and President (2005 to 2011) of the Consortium of Universities for Research in Earthquake Engineering (CUREE)

Research career 
Whittaker has developed applied research products for use in the seismic and blast/impact analysis and design of buildings, bridges, and infrastructure, including nuclear power plants. His research products are referenced in ASCE/SEI Standards 4, 7, 41, and 43, the 2010 AASHTO Guide Specification for Seismic Isolation Design, and FEMA 273, 27, and P-58. 
Whittaker was a contributor to the development of the first generation of tools for performance-based earthquake engineering, first published as FEMA 273 and FEMA 274, and later as ASCE 41, and led the Structural Performance Products team that developed the second generation of tools for performance-based earthquake engineering, published as FEMA-P-58 Volumes 1, 2 and 3. He directed ATC project 34 that studied seismic response modification factors and other critical code issues (1993 to 2002) and ATC Project 82 that developed guidance on the selection and scaling of earthquake ground motions for response-history analysis (2010 to 2012). 
Whittaker developed the technical basis for maximum-direction ground motions for ASCE/SEI 7-10, and for the implementation of seismic isolation in safety-related nuclear structures that is codified in Chapter 12 of ASCE/SEI 4-16, will be codified in Chapter 9 of ASCE/SEI 43-19, and is documented in three NUREG/CRs published by the US Nuclear Regulatory Commission.

Honors and awards 
Whittaker has held the rank of State University of New York (SUNY) Distinguished Professor, the highest academic rank in the SUNY system, since 2018. He received the American Society of Civil Engineers (ASCE) Walter P. Moore Award in 2017, the ASCE Stephen D. Bechtel Energy Award in 2017, and was elected to Fellow of the American Concrete Institute in 2012, Fellow of the American Society of Civil Engineers in 2016, and Fellow of the Structural Engineering Institute of ASCE in 2016. Whittaker was named as a Professor of Earthquake Engineering at the International Joint Laboratory for Earthquake Engineering Research at Tongji University in China in 2018, and the United Kingdom’s Institution of Civil Engineers Mallet-Milne lecturer in 2019. 
In 2002, Whittaker, together with his SUNY colleague Michael Constantinou and Thornton-Tomasetti, received the American Council of Engineering Companies and the New York Association of Consulting Engineering Companies Diamond Award.

Selected papers 
Whittaker, A.S., V.V. Bertero, C.L. Thompson and L.J. Alonso, "Seismic testing of steel-plate energy dissipating devices," Earthquake Spectra, Vol. 7, No.4, 1991, 563-604
Mosqueda, G., A. S. Whittaker and G. L. Fenves, "Characterization and modeling of Friction Pendulum bearings subjected to multiple components of excitation," Journal of Structural Engineering, Vol. 130, No. 3, 2004, 433-442.
Gulec, K., A. S. Whittaker and B. Stojadinovic, "Shear strength of squat rectangular reinforced concrete walls," ACI Structural Journal, Vol. 105, No. 4, 2008, 488-497.
Huang, Y.-N., A. S. Whittaker, and N. Luco, "Seismic performance assessment of base-isolated safety-related nuclear structures," Earthquake Engineering & Structural Dynamics, Vol. 39, No. 13, 2010, 1421-1442.
Huang, Y.-N., A. S. Whittaker, N. Luco, and R. O. Hamburger, "Selection and scaling of earthquake ground motions in support of performance-based design," Journal of Structural Engineering, Vol. 137, No. 3, 2011, 311-321.
Huang, Y.-N., A. S. Whittaker, and N. Luco, "A seismic risk assessment procedure for nuclear power plants, (I) methodology," Nuclear Engineering and Design, Vol. 241, 2011, 3996-4003.
Kumar, M., A. S. Whittaker and M. C. Constantinou, "An advanced numerical model of elastomeric seismic isolation bearings," Earthquake Engineering & Structural Dynamics, Vol. 43, No. 13, 2014, 1955-1974.
Kumar, M., A. S. Whittaker, and M. C. Constantinou, "Characterizing friction in sliding isolation bearings," Earthquake Engineering & Structural Dynamics, Vol. 44, No. 9, 2015, 1409-1425.
Shin, J., A. S. Whittaker, and D. Cormie, "Incident and normally reflected overpressure and impulse for detonations of spherical high explosives in free air," Journal of Structural Engineering, Vol. 141, No. 12, 2015.
Kumar, M., A. S. Whittaker, R. P. Kennedy, J. J. Johnson and A. M. Kammerer. "Seismic probabilistic risk assessment for seismically isolated safety-related nuclear facilities," Nuclear Engineering and Design, Vol. 313, 2017, 386-400.
Terranova, B., A. S. Whittaker, and L. Schwer, "Simulation of wind-borne missile impact using Lagrangian and Smooth Particle Hydrodynamics formulations," International Journal of Impact Engineering, Vol. 117, 2018, 1-12.
Epackachi, S. and A. S. Whittaker, "A validated numerical model for predicting the in-plane seismic response of lightly reinforced, low aspect ratio RC shear walls," Engineering Structures, Vol. 168, 2018, 589-611.
Whittaker, A. S., P. Sollogoub, and M.-K. Kim, "Seismic isolation of nuclear power plants: Past, present and future," Nuclear Engineering and Design, Vol. 338, 2018, 290-299.
Kumar, M. and A. S. Whittaker, "Cross-platform implementation, verification and validation of advanced models of elastomeric seismic isolation bearings," Engineering Structures, Vol. 175, 2018, 926-943.
Luna, B. and A. S. Whittaker, "Peak strength of shear-critical reinforced concrete walls," ACI Structural Journal, Vol. 16, No. 2, 2019, 257-266.
Shin, J., and A. S. Whittaker, “Blast wave clearing for detonations of high explosives,” Journal of Structural Engineering, Vol. 145, No. 7, 2019.
Terranova, B., A. S. Whittaker, and L. Schwer, “Design of reinforced concrete walls and slabs for wind-borne missile loadings,” In Press, Engineering Structures, May 2019.

References 

1956 births
Living people
University at Buffalo faculty
University of Melbourne alumni
UC Berkeley College of Engineering alumni
Engineers from California
Engineering academics
American civil engineers
20th-century American engineers
21st-century American engineers
Fellows of the American Society of Civil Engineers
American structural engineers